USS Crenshaw (APA-76) was a Gilliam-class attack transport that served with the United States Navy from 1945 to 1946. She was scrapped in 1964.

History
Crenshaw was named after a county in Alabama. She was launched 27 October 1944 by Consolidated Steel at Wilmington, California, under a Maritime Commission contract;  transferred to the Navy 3 January 1945; and commissioned the next day.

World War II
Crenshaw arrived at Pearl Harbor 5 March 1945 and joined in amphibious training in the Hawaiian Islands until 9 June when she sailed with passengers for San Francisco. She sailed to Seattle for repairs and from there put to sea 7 July for Pearl Harbor, Eniwetok, Ulithi, and Okinawa, arriving just after the end of hostilities on 12 August.

Postwar transport missions

On occupation duty she carried Marines to Jinsen, Korea and to Taku, China, then sailed by way of Manila to Hong Kong to transport Chinese troops to Chinwangtao and Tsingtao. At Nagoya, Japan, she embarked homeward-bound troops and sailed 27 November for Tacoma, Washington, arriving 11 December.

Decommissioning
Crenshaw was decommissioned at Seattle 19 April 1946 and delivered to the War Shipping Administration 30 June 1946 for disposal. She was scrapped by Zidell Explorations Inc. on 22 December 1964.

References
 
 APA-76 Crenshaw, Navsource Online.

 

Gilliam-class attack transports
Transports of the United States Navy
World War II auxiliary ships of the United States
World War II amphibious warfare vessels of the United States
Crenshaw County, Alabama
Ships built in Los Angeles
1944 ships